Jayant Rajaram Patil (born 16 February 1962) is an Indian politician from the state of Maharashtra. He has been representing Islampur (Vidhan Sabha constituency) in the Maharashtra Legislative Assembly for more than 3 decades. He was the Cabinet Minister of the Water Resources Department in Uddhav Thackeray ministry. Previously he has been the Rural Development Minister (2009 to 2014), the Finance Minister (1999 to 2008) and the Home Minister (2008 to 2009) of Maharashtra.

Early life and education

Jayant Patil is the younger son of former Maharashtra Cabinet Minister and celebrated veteran Congress leader, Rajarambapu Patil. He was named ‘jayant’ meaning victorious, since he was born shortly after his father’s first electoral victory in the 1962 Maharashtra Legislative Assembly election. Jayantrao completed his Bachelors in Civil Engineering from the Veermata Jijabai Technological Institute and subsequently left to pursue his Masters’ Degree from the New Jersey Institute of Technology, USA. Unfortunately, after the sudden death of Rajarambapu Patil in 1984, Jayant Patil had to return from the USA. After returning to his home town he preferred not to contest any parliamentary election and became involved in social work through his father’s cooperative organisations. With the determination and persistence of the people, he was unanimously elected the President of the Kasegaon Education Society and the Chairman of the Walwa Sugar Cooperation in the same year.

After working around six years in the overall development of the Sangli area, Patil was given a ticket to contest the State Legislative Assembly elections from Walwa at the age of 28.

Entry into politics

Patil contested the 1990 Maharashtra Legislative Assembly election on an Indian National Congress ticket from Walwa in the Sangli District. Since then, he has represented Islampur-Walwa constituency 7 times, i.e. 30 years with an average margin of 62,000.

Between 1995 and 1999, when the first Sena-BJP Government was in power in the State, Jayant Patil was a part of the famous ‘Patil Troika’ which kept the saffron Government on its toes in the Assembly. Among the two other Patils were the former Deputy Chief Minister, R. R. Patil and former Assembly speaker Dilip Walse-Patil. After their split from Congress in 1999, the Patil Troika decided to throw their weight behind Sharad Pawar.

Formation of Nationalist Congress Party

In 1999, after the 12th Lok Sabha was dissolved and elections to the 13th Lok Sabha were called, Sharad Pawar, P. A. Sangma, and Tariq Anwar demanded that the party needed to propose someone native-born as the prime ministerial candidate and not the Italian-born Sonia Gandhi, who had entered party politics and replaced Sitaram Kesri as Congress president. In response, the Congress Working Committee (CWC) expelled the trio for six years from the party.

In response Pawar and Sangma founded the Nationalist Congress Party in June 1999. Despite the falling out, the new party aligned with the Congress party to form a coalition government in Maharashtra after the 1999 Maharashtra Legislative Assembly election to prevent the Shiv Sena-BJP combine from returning to power. Sharad Pawar, however, did not return to state politics and Vilasrao Deshmukh of Congress was chosen as Chief Minister, with Chagan Bhujbal representing the NCP as the Deputy Chief Minister along with Home Affairs and Jayant Patil as the Finance Minister.

In government

Jayant Patil became the youngest finance minister of Maharashtra, presenting his first budget at the age of 39. He went on to present the Maharashtra Budget 10 times consecutively, a record till date, and brought many major changes to the State. He is often credited with reviving the state economy from a low point in 2003-2004. At the time, the State’s financial condition was in a precarious condition due to overspending by the previous Government in ambitious projects like the Mumbai–Pune Expressway, Krishna Valley Irrigation Project, etc. Additionally, the implementation of the 5th Pay Commission had also put a considerable strain on the State’s financial resources. In 2001, Jayant Patil met with a severe accident near Bangalore and had to undergo multiple operations on his fractured legs and was confined to a wheelchair for several months. He presented the finance budget of 2001 while he was still on the wheelchair.

In his 10-year stint as the finance Minister from 1999-2008, Patil took firm steps to strengthen the State’s finances like delinking dearness allowance paid to the State Government from the Central Government, appointing a committee of secretaries to probe the issues of excess State Government staff and acting and abolishing many posts in the State Government. He also tried to delay the implementation of the 6th Pay Commission as much as possible. Taking advantage of falling interest rates, Jayant Patil also raised fresh loans to retire high cost debts. All these measures reduced the State Government’s expenditure on items like salary, pension and interest from 75 percent of the total expenditure to around 60 percent.

In the aftermath of the November 2008 Mumbai attacks, R. R. Patil resigned as the Home Minister. After NCP accepted the resignation, Patil was sworn in as Home Minister of Maharashtra in the First Ashok Chavan ministry. For the next one year as the Home Minister of Maharashtra, Patil played a highly crucial role in modernizing the Maharashtra Police, in terms of equipment and training. He established the Force 1, which is an elite counter-terrorism unit of the Mumbai Police with highly upgraded modern weapons. Formed on the lines of the National Security Guards (NSG), its initial training was with the Israeli Special forces and is mainly responsible to guard the Mumbai Metropolitan Area. During this tenure as Home Minister, Patil also passed proposals to install almost 5000 CCTVs in across Mumbai.

In 2009, Jayant Patil was sworn in as the Rural Development Minister in the Second Ashok Chavan ministry and continued with the same in the Prithviraj Chavan ministry. His tenure as the Rural Development Minister till 2014 saw some pioneering works including the implementation of E-Panchayats, the improvement of e-banking services in rural Maharashtra and development of sustainable eco-villages. The Eco-Villages Scheme was a grand plan in line to combat climate change and to improve the development and preservation of villages in Maharashtra. The programme involved uplifting the environmental standard of villages and plan their infrastructural development to avoid haphazard constructions. Villages qualified for the scheme received a lump sum fund every year to be used in various development capacities. Jayant Patil toured Maharashtra for the outreach of the scheme and conducted 120 meetings with villagers across Maharashtra. This scheme significantly improved the tax collection from villages across the State and championed the plantation of over 1 crore trees.

Present political career

In the 2014 Maharashtra Legislative Assembly election, NCP was reduced to just 41 seats, their biggest defeat till date and was in the Opposition benches almost after a decade. Jayant Patil retained his constituency and soon became NCP’s leading speaker in the Assembly, regularly opening debates and keeping a strong tone on the Government. In 2018 he was unanimously elected as the State President of NCP replacing Sunil Tatkare. Patil had the uphill battle of reorganizing and delivering a better result in the 2019 Assembly Elections. Going into the elections, the NCP and INC alliance was not touted to do well, and the entire burden of campaigning and outreach fell on NCP solely. In August 2019, Jayant Patil launched and spearheaded the Shiv Swarajya Yatra from Shivneri, the birthplace of Chharapati Shivaji, at Junnar, Pune. In the 2019 Maharashtra Legislative Assembly election, BJP won 105 seats, SHS won 56, NCP won 54 seats and INC won 42 seats. A political crisis ensued in the post-poll period. With no political party able to prove their majority in the legislative assembly, president's rule was imposed in the state following a recommendation by the Governor of Maharashtra Bhagat Singh Koshyari. The President's rule was later revoked and the Bharatiya Janata Party, led by former Chief Minister Devendra Fadnavis, formed a government with the help of a small fraction of the Nationalist Congress Party, led by Ajit Pawar. After three days, Fadnavis and Ajit Pawar resigned. A new government was formed by the Maha Vikas Aghadi, a new alliance of Shiv Sena, the Indian National Congress, and the Nationalist Congress Party with Uddhav Thackeray as the Chief Minister. Jayant Patil was one of the was among the first 6 to be sworn-in in the MVA Government. He became a Cabinet Minister for the 4th time with the portfolio of Water Resources & Command Area Development.

Additionally, he was elected as the leader of the NCP Legislative Party in the Vidhan Sabha in place of Ajit Pawar on 24 November 2019. He is also the Guardian Minister of Sangli.

In June 2020, in celebration of 21 years of NCP, Jayant Patil under the guidance of Sharad Pawar, launched the Rashtravadi Paksh Abhipray, an internal party digital feedback campaign. It was a flagship campaign where the party digitally reached out to almost 10 lac NCP members to amass their feedback and suggestions.

Philanthropic work and development of Sangli

Rajarambapu Patil was a noted educationist and philanthropist in his own right and started the Kasegaon Education Society. From as early as 1955, he implemented numerous social development initiatives such as buildings for schools, drinking water wells, homes for poor, banking services, jobs for youth, etc. which had direct benefits for the masses of the area. Following in his father’s footsteps, Jayant Patil’s involvement with socio-development works in the Sangli area started before his political career.

He is credited for bringing piped drinking and farm water to the Walva Taluka from 15 kilometers away before which the area was limited to traditional means. In 2006, on his birthday, Jayant Poverty Eradication Campaign was started to uplift about 12,000 BPL families from the Walwa region. Till date the campaign has benefited more than 50,000 individuals with a total amount of 48 crores. The organization aides in health services, education, housing, employment, financial assistance, rehabilitation, youth guidance, accessing Government schemes, etc.

Like other NCP leaders in Maharashtra, he has various education institutes and cooperative bodies under his patronage, many of which were established by his father. All of these organizations work for the upliftment of the lives of the people around them. Some of them include: 1. Rajarambapu Institute of Technology (RIT); 2. Cooperative Milk Federation popularly known as Krishna Dudh; 3.Sugar Factories; 4.Rajarambapu Textile Park; 5.Rajarambapu Sahakari Bank Limited(Scheduled Bank) 6.Kasegaon Education Society 7. Food Processing Units.

Personal life

Jayant Patil is married to Shailaja Patil, who is involved with social and relief works in the Sangli region. They have two sons, Prateek Patil and Rajvardhan Patil. He lives in Mumbai and Uran Islampur.

References 

1963 births
Living people
Marathi politicians
Nationalist Congress Party politicians from Maharashtra
Maharashtra MLAs 2014–2019
People from Sangli district
Maharashtra MLAs 2009–2014
Indian National Congress politicians from Maharashtra